Amy Jaclyn Gumenick (born 17 May 1986) is a Swedish-born American actress, best known for her roles as Natalee Holloway in the television film of the same name (2009) and its sequel, as the young Mary Winchester in Supernatural (2008–10), as Carrie Cutter / Cupid in Arrow (2014–2019) and as Philomena Cheer in Turn: Washington's Spies (2014–17).

Early life
Gumenick was born in Hudiksvall, Sweden, the daughter of a Russian father and Polish mother. She graduated from the University of California, Santa Barbara in 2008, earning a BFA in theatre with an emphasis in acting.

Career
Gumenick's first role was in a short film entitled Sayonara Elviko, before she moved on to Army Wives. She then starred in a series of webisodes for the television show My Own Worst Enemy, before being cast as the young Mary Campbell, who became Mary Winchester, on Supernatural.

She then had roles on How I Met Your Mother, Grey's Anatomy, Ghost Whisperer and Bones before being cast as Natalee Holloway in the Lifetime movie Natalee Holloway. She also appeared in the movie's 2011 sequel, Justice for Natalee Holloway.

She subsequently appeared in episodes of Castle, No Ordinary Family, The Glades, The Closer, Grimm, CSI: Miami, CSI: NY and Rules of Engagement.

In 2014, she began playing the recurring character Philomena on the AMC series Turn: Washington's Spies. In August 2014, it was announced that she had been cast as Carrie Cutter / Cupid on The CW series Arrow.

Filmography

Film

Television

Web

References

External links 

 
 

1986 births
21st-century American actresses
21st-century Swedish actresses
American film actresses
American people of Polish descent
American people of Russian descent
American television actresses
Living people
People from Hudiksvall Municipality
Swedish film actresses
Swedish people of Polish descent
Swedish people of Russian descent
Swedish television actresses
University of California, Santa Barbara alumni